The Captain John Bissell Memorial Bridge carries I-291 over the Connecticut River, connecting the towns of Windsor, Connecticut and South Windsor, Connecticut.  There is a pedestrian crossing on the bridge on the westbound, upstream side.

History and construction of the Bridge
The Bulkeley Bridge was the only bridge crossing on the Connecticut River for miles in the early 20th century. Then it was proposed in the 1930s to build two more road bridges on the river for the Wilbur Cross Highway. In 1955 the new Charter Oak Bridge, built 10 years earlier, was not helping to ease traffic on the Bulkeley Bridge. The Greater Hartford Bridge Authority was created to build this bridge and the Putnam Bridge in Glastonbury. An Interstate bypass was also be planned to be built in the Hartford Area, eventually becoming I-291. The bridge and bypass opened on December 16, 1957, from I-91 to US 5. The bridge was originally called Wolcott Bridge, because of the name of the road formerly carried on it. It was renamed in 1960 to its current name. A toll was charged on the bridge until a tollbooth accident in 1983, which was one of the toll accidents that resulted in statewide removal of tollbooths in the 1980s.

See also
 
 
 
 List of crossings of the Connecticut River

References

External links

 

Bridges over the Connecticut River
Windsor, Connecticut
Bridges completed in 1958
Bridges in Hartford County, Connecticut
Road bridges in Connecticut
Interstate 91
Bridges on the Interstate Highway System
Former toll bridges in Connecticut